Hanuman Jayanti is a Hindu festival that celebrates the birth of the Hindu deity, and one of the protagonists of the Ramayana, Hanuman. In most states of India, the festival is observed on the full-moon day of the Hindu month of Chaitra (Chaitra Purnima). In Karnataka, Hanuman Jayanti is observed on Shukla Paksha Trayodashi, during the Margashirsha month or in Vaishakha, while in a few states like Kerala and Tamil Nadu, it is celebrated during the month of Dhanu (called Margali in Tamil). Hanuman Jayanti is observed on Pana Sankranti in the eastern state of Odisha. This day is also observed as the Odia new year which falls on April 13th/14th/15th every year . In northern India, it is celebrated on the fourteenth day of the lunar month of Kartika. 

Hanuman is regarded to be an ardent devotee of Rama, an incarnation of Vishnu, widely known for his unflinching devotion. He is revered as a symbol of strength and energy, and is venerated for these reasons on this occasion.

Legend 

Hanuman is a vanara, born to Kesari and Anjana. Hanuman is also known as the son of Vayu, the wind-god. His mother, Anjana, was an apsara who was born on earth due to a curse. She was redeemed from this curse upon giving birth to a son. The Valmiki Ramayana states that his father, Kesari, was the son of Brihaspati, the king of a region named Sumeru, located near the kingdom of Kishkindha. Anjana is said to have performed intense prayers lasting twelve years to Rudra to bear a child. Pleased with their devotion, Rudra granted them the son they sought. 

Eknath's Bhavartha Ramayana states that when Anjana was worshiping Rudra, King Dasharatha of Ayodhya was also performing the ritual of Putrakameshti in order to have children. As a result, he received some sacred pudding (payasam) to be shared by his three wives, leading to the births of Rama, Lakshmana, Bharata, and Shatrughna. By divine ordinance, a kite snatched a fragment of that pudding and dropped it while flying over the forest where Anjana was engaged in worship. Vayu, delivered the falling pudding to the outstretched hands of Anjana, who consumed it. Hanuman was born to her as a result.

Worship 
Hanuman is worshipped as a deity with the ability to gain victory over evil and provide protection. On this festival, devotees of Hanuman celebrate him and seek his protection and blessings. They join in temples to worship him and present religious offerings. In return, the devotees receive prasadam by the temple priests as sweets, flowers, coconuts, tilaka, sacred ash (udi) and holy water from the river Ganges (Ganga jalam). People who revere him also recite various devotional hymns and prayers like the Hanuman Chalisa and read holy scriptures like the Ramayana and Mahabharata. Devotees visit temples and apply a tilaka of sinduram to their foreheads from Hanuman's murti. According to legend, when Hanuman found Sita applying sinduram to her forehead, he enquired about this custom. She replied that doing so would ensure a long life for her husband, Rama. Hanuman then proceeded to smear his entire body with sinduram, thus ensuring Rama's immortality.

In Tamil Nadu and Kerala, Hanuman Jayanti is celebrated on the New Moon day in Margali (Dhanu) month. Famous Hanuman temples in these states like Nanganallur, Namakkal, Suchindram, Thrikkaviyoor and Alathiyoor celebrate this day with pomp.

In Telangana and Andhra Pradesh, Hanuman Jayanti is celebrated by a diksha of 41 days, beginning on Chaitra Purnima, and concluding on the tenth day during Krishna Paksha in Vaishaka. 

In Maharashtra, Hanuman Jayanti is celebrated on the full moon day (pūrnima) of the Hindu lunar month of Chaitra. A special feature of Hanuman Jayanti is that according to some religious almanacs (panchāngs) the birthday of Hanuman falls on the fourteenth day (chaturdashi) in the dark fortnight of the month of Ashvin, while according to others it falls on the full moon day in the bright fortnight of Chaitra. On this day in a Hanuman temple, spiritual discourses begin at dawn since Hanuman is believed to have been born during sunrise. During the time frame of birth, the spiritual discourse are halted and the offering of food (prasadam) is distributed to everyone. Spiritual discourses are organised in most of the Hindu temples of the region on this day. 

In Odisha, Pana Sankranti (April 13/14/15) is believed to be the birthday of Lord Hanuman. The temples remain crowded and people chant Hanuman Chalisha throughout the day. Reading the Sundarkaand on this day is also said to be a pious exercise. The day also marks the beginning of the New Year in the traditional Odia Solar Calendar. The festival occurs in the solar Odia calendar (the lunisolar Hindu calendar followed in Odisha) on the first day of the traditional solar month of Meṣa.

See also 
Narasimha Jayanti
Rama Navami
Krishna Janmashtami
Anjaneya Temple, Nanganallur

References

External links

Festivals in India
January observances 
March observances
April observances
Hindu holy days
Hindu festivals in India
Hanuman